Thunivu is a 2023 Indian Tamil-language action heist film written and directed by H. Vinoth, and produced by Boney Kapoor. It stars Ajith Kumar in lead role with Manju Warrier, Samuthirakani, John Kokken, Ajay and Veera in supporting roles.

The film was announced with the tentative title AK61 (Ajith's 61st film in a leading role) in February 2022, the third collaboration between Ajith, Vinoth and Kapoor after Nerkonda Paarvai (2019) and Valimai (2022). Principal photography commenced in April and ended that October, taking place in Hyderabad and Bangkok. The title Thunivu was announced in September. Post-production works began in late-October and were completed that December.

Thunivu was released theatrically in the week of Pongal on 11 January 2023. The film received mixed reviews from critics and was a commercial success.

Plot 
 

Radha, a dreaded gangster, and his men plan a heist at "Your Bank", one of the biggest privately-owned bank in Chennai, with the support of ACP Ramachandran. They plan to rob 500 crore on 21 May, coinciding with the Governor's party event at his residence. On the day of the heist, Radha and his men hijack the bank, only to discover that the bank is already hijacked by a mysterious man nicknamed Michael Jackson and his accomplice, Kanmani. The commandos arrive inside the bank, but get defeated.

Jackson later makes a deal with Radha to help him rob 5000 crores, in exchange for a share of the money, for which Radha and his men reluctantly agree. When Radha finds that the bank locker contains only 1,510 crores, they decide to kill Jackson, only to be defeated. Jackson insists that Antony alias Anto, a police constable to be the negotiator, much to Ramachandran's ire. He uses a voice changer of Michael Jackson, tricking the people and the media into referring him as Michael Jackson. Ramachandran tries to kill Jackson with a sniper, only for him to make an explosion in a car parked nearby the bank using a bomb.

With the events being leaked to the media, city commissioner Dayalan is called in to handle the situation. While inspecting the bank, Jackson finds explosives, disguised as fire extinguishers, and deduces that a third team has also entered the bank, without him knowing. The police tracks a van where Kanmani is guiding Jackson, but Kanmani destroys the van, and escapes. Ramachandran sends his men to trace Kanmani, but she kills them and exposes Ramachandran's involvement in the heist to Dayalan, who interrogates him, and he confesses that he along with his childhood friend Shyam, the Tamil Nadu Branch Head of Your Bank, planned the heist.

Ramachandran tried hiring Jackson, who goes by the name "Dark Devil", for the job, but he refused. Ramachandran later hired Radha's gang for the job, without revealing that they will be killed after the heist. Radha and his gang join and assist Dark Devil after hearing Ramachandran's confession through bugs planted on Dayalan's base. Shyam flees from police after they learnt about his involvement, but is captured by Kanmani. Meanwhile, Dayalan finds that Valavan was the one who wired and planted explosives in the drainage, and begins to search for him. He also learns that Dark Devil and his team actually died a few months ago.

Ramachandran tries to prove that Dark Devil is alive by detonating a dummy bomb only to get killed when the bomb turns out to be a real one and explodes after the wire in it gets detached. Dark Devil learns from Kanmani that there are 25,000 crores available in the bank. Dark Devil tells Dayalan to arrange a meeting between him and chairman of Your Bank, Krish. As Dark Devil deduced, the third team, revealed to be some of the bank's staff, attack Radha and his team in the locker, before assaulting Dark Devil and hold him captive. Krish arrives and reveals that the third team were hired by him and tells them to destroy the bank's chest with explosives with hostage inside.

Krish also forces Dark Devil to reveal himself, where Dark Devil reveals that he and his teammates lived happily together like a family. After having committed a heist in Bangkok, Dark Devil's members, Jijo and Achara planned to get married. They all travelled to Araku Valley, Andhra Pradesh to arrange their marriage and celebrate, but they were ambushed by assailants sent by Krish and Shyam, who feared that they would reveal their heist plan to others. Jijo and Achara got killed, but Dark Devil and Kanmani managed to escape and the killers faked their deaths for the rest of their deal money. The duo reached the house of an old couple, who tends their wounds and revealed about his son Kavin, an honest bank official, who wanted to return the money to the people who invested in mutual funds.

However, Kavin was killed by Krish, and made it look like a mob did this during a strike. Having learnt about this, Dark Devil and Kanmani decided to bring Krish and the bank officials to justice. After the revelation, Dark Devil defeats Krish and his team, where he forces him on live to reveal about his financial scam of the 25,000 crore, which was invested in the mutual funds, and the atrocities committed against people by the bank officials. Shyam, who was made to wear a bomb vest is sent to Dayalan, where he reveals everything about the heist and Krish's involvement in it, before he is killed by Kanmani's phone call.

Dark Devil also brings mutual funds chairman Harsha, who was abducted by Kanmani at gunpoint and Sunil Dutta, who was abducted from Mauritius by Dark Devil's men and was also responsible for stealing data from the NSE backup server of the Indian Stock Exchange. Sunil confesses that he invested in 10 companies belonging to Krish and reveals that the 25,000 crore is in the bank's secret chest locker. With the help of a mole in the media, Krish falsely frames Dark Devil and his team as terrorists, and cuts the live telecast. Dayalan learns from Rajesh that everyone in the bank are going to be killed, except Krish, before commandos arrive and take control of the situation, and Dayalan is suspended.

In the bank, Dark Devil opens the secret locker with the help of Radha and his men, only to find that the money is counterfeit money. Dark Devil locks Krish, Sunil and Harsha in the secret locker, before Krish reveals that the money is stacked in 25 of the 1500 containers of his ship, which he discreetly records as a video. The commandos open fire, with the bank severely damaged. Krish, Sunil and Harsha are killed in the secret locker by an explosive. Kanmani arrives in a fire truck stuffed with RDX, and threatens to detonate them, unless the hostages are released, forcing the commandos to cease fire. She along with Dark Devil, wearing masks, escape with the help of the public and reach a boat, planning to escape by sea, while Radha and his gang also escape in the ensuing chaos.

A chase ensues where Dark Devil, Kanmani, and the rest of their team shoot the commandos and coast guards, using an M2 Browning. However, they get shot and fall into the sea. Later, the media broadcasts the video which Dark Devil discreetly recorded, and Dayalan's suspension is revoked. Meanwhile, Dark Devil and Kanmani fake their deaths and escape using sea scooters and reached their boat, settling in international waters. Dayalan and his team board a helicopter to the ship, where they find the 25,000 crore.

Cast

Production

Development 
Ajith Kumar's 60th film, Valimai (2022) under the direction of H. Vinoth and produced by Boney Kapoor, faced several production delays due to the COVID-19 pandemic. In March 2021, Kapoor hinted on collaborating for the actor's 61st film and Vinoth directing the film, which would mark their third consecutive collaboration following Nerkonda Paarvai (2019) and Valimai, which was later confirmed on September 2021. Sources reported that Kapoor suffered financial problems following the protracted production of Valimai, which necessitated a third collaboration between the actor and director, though he denied such claims in an interview before Valimai's release. Initially  Ajith planned for collaborating with a different director, but agreed to join with Vinoth after watching the rough edit of Valimai.

On 15 February 2022, the project was officially announced under the working title AK 61, and pre-production works for the film began the same time. Kapoor also shared a still featuring Ajith in a long beard with coolers in a monochrome format, which would be the looks for his film. As a part of the film's shoot, a huge set resembling Mount Road in Chennai would be erected at Ramoji Film City in Hyderabad, where much of the film's shoot would take place. Vinoth recruited cinematographer Nirav Shah and editor Vijay Velukutty, who worked on Valimai, while music composer Ghibran and art director Milan, were signed on. Supreme Sundar was hired to choreograph the action sequences. The official title Thunivu was announced on 21 September 2022.

In December 2022, Vinoth revealed in an interview to The Times of India, saying in response that the film is a heist film, that the film blends multiple genres and cannot be slotted under the particular genre. Vinoth said he narrated a single scene, written for a planned low-budget film, to Ajith; after he showed an interest in signing the film, Vinoth increased the scale of the project. Vinoth elaborated, "The film is about money. It is something that we use on a daily basis, but if someone asks us what money is, how currency operates and what reference money is, we'd hardly have an idea". He further recalled that Ajith does not play a dual role in the film, as was speculated, and his character will be kept under wraps.

Casting 
Thunivu was reported to be trying to cast actors from "across the industry" in the film. In May 2022, a month after filming began, Manju Warrier was signed as the lead actress, her second Tamil film after Asuran (2019), though she would not play Ajith's love interest. Vinoth wanted to cast an actress closer to Ajith's age and chose Warrier as he felt that "audiences would expect a strong character from her as she's a terrific performer. Since she's done many performance-oriented roles, we decided to show a different facet of hers by having her do action, which would make her character feel fresh."

The same month, John Kokken, and Veera signed the film, along with Samuthirakani and Mahanadi Shankar, who collaborates with Ajith after 20 years since Dheena (2001). In June 2022, Nayana Sai was cast in for the film, and the following month, Telugu actor Ajay, and Mamathi Chari joined the film, and shot few key sequences. Shaam was approached to play a negative role, but declined due to scheduling conflicts with Varisu. Chirag Jani also play an important role, which he described as his "biggest role in Tamil" after Kaappaan (2019). Jani said his character is a businessman with grey shades, "not a typical villain role" and would have "a very classy, corporate look". Bigg Boss 6 contestant GP Muthu's presence in the film was confirmed on 23 December 2022.

Filming 
The film was expected to begin filming on mid-March 2022, but was delayed due to extensive pre-production. Principal photography began on 11 April 2022 at Hyderabad, where few scenes had been shot without Ajith. The actor later joined the film's shoot in 22 April. The following month, Kapoor said in an interview that 36 days of film's shooting has been completed and the film would be wrapped entirely during July–August 2022. A unit from the film had shot few sequences from Mount Road in Chennai, instead of the set production in Hyderabad. On 10 June 2022, the film's first schedule was completed, and the team later took a schedule break as Ajith went on a family vacation to United Kingdom. Few sequences, without the actor had been shot, with Manju Warrier also joining.

In July 2022, Vinoth shot few action sequences at the outskirts of Vandalur, Chennai, where a bridge sequence with a group of fighters being shot. In July 2022, fans leaked stills of the bank set from the film, which had resembled a "french style building". The second schedule began on 12 August 2022, which was intended to be shot at Pune, but was later shifted to Chennai. However, it was again shifted to Visakhapatnam, where the team had planned to shoot for few scenes at the Araku Valley hill station, 100 kilometres away from Visakhapatnam. This schedule was completed on 24 August 2022, and the team returned to Hyderabad for filming crucial sequences which was completed early September.

The final shooting schedule was intended to take place in Bangkok on 15 September 2022, where an action sequence is intended to be shot within 21 days. But the shooting took place on 25 September 2022, and was wrapped by 12 October. On 16 October, patchwork shooting for the film progressed in Chennai, where a body double of Ajith had shot for the robbery sequence. Ajith later joined the shooting six days later. In mid-November, it was reported that the most of filming had been wrapped, except for two songs in the film, which would be completed within the end of the month. On 11 November 2022, the makers shot for a promotional song titled "Kasethan Kadavulada" at Gokulam Studios in Chennai, and another song "Chilla Chilla" was shot at the same set few days later. Principal photography wrapped up on 30 November.

In an interview to regional media, stunt choreographer Supreme Sundar had choreographed for a 360-degree action sequence which was shot in 32 seconds. Sundar also said that Ajith was given the chance to perform other stunts as even a small mistake would require to reshoot from the beginning, but was very cooperative and enthusiastic to perform the sequence. He revealed that the first four takes did not go well, but with few minor changes, Ajith was able to perform the stunt, with the shot being perfect in the 13th take.

Post-production 
Post-production works began simultaneously on late-October, with Warrier and Ajith dubbing for their portions by November 2022. John Kokken also dubbed for his portions in Tamil, which was the first time he did, as was Chirag Jani, who was assisted by Ajith in dubbing for the film, translating it in Hindi and English, due to his fluency in the languages. In late December, the final edit of the film, was sent to the Central Board of Film Certification for the censoring process.

Music 

The music of the film is composed by Ghibran, in his 50th film as a composer and marking his second collaboration with Ajith Kumar and Boney Kapoor after scoring Valimai (2022). The first single titled "Chilla Chilla" was released on 9 December 2022, and the second single "Kasethan Kadavulada" on 18 December. Manju Warrier provided vocals only for the video version of the song. The third single "Gangstaa" was released on 25 December.

Background score 
The film score is composed by Ghibran. The official background score was released on 10 February 2022.

Marketing 
Overseas promotions for the film began on late-December 2022. On 26 December 2022, skydiving promotions of the film were held in Dubai, with the film's posters being unveiled by the skydiving crew members making it the second Tamil film to do so after 2.0 (2018). The makers then announced the release date for the trailer of the film as 31 December 2022 on the eve of New Year. It was reported that the film's trailer will be screened at Burj Khalifa in Dubai and in New York's Times Square. Within 24 hours of its premiere on YouTube, the trailer received over 25 million views.

Release

Theatrical 
Thunivu was released theatrically on 11 January 2023 in the week of Pongal, clashing with Varisu.

Pre-release business 
The Andhra Pradesh and Telangana theatrical rights were sold at a very low price of over  crores. The Hindi-dubbing rights of the film were sold for  crores.

Distribution 
The Tamil Nadu distribution rights of the film were acquired by Red Giant Movies, through profit-sharing basis. Romeo Pictures, which distributed all of Kapoor's Tamil film productions in the state, including Valimai, would co-distribute the film. Lyca Productions and Tentkotta acquired the overseas distribution rights, which would distribute the film through their sub-distributors: Sarigama Cinemas (United States), Boleyn Cinemas (United Kingdom and Europe), Phars Film (Middle East), Malik Streams (Malaysia and Singapore), Vansan Movies (Australia and New Zealand), York Cinemas (Canada), excluding Sri Lanka where it would be released by the distributor themselves. The Andhra Pradesh and Telangana distribution rights of the film were acquired by Dil Raju under the banner Radha Krishna Entertainments and Ivy Productions.

Home media 
The post-theatrical streaming rights of the film were sold to Netflix, while the satellite rights of the film were sold to Kalaignar TV. The film was premiered on Netflix from 8 February 2023.

Reception 
Thunivu received mixed reviews from critics.

M. Suganth of The Times of India gave 3 out of 5 stars and wrote "Despite raising many relevant questions about the operations of our financial institutions and the impact that has on the common man, the film’s refusal to show it as something that affected the protagonist directly makes it impossible to root for him whole-heartedly. And when the film turns into a logic-defying chase on the sea, we begin to wonder if guts alone can be enough for glory". Janani K of India Today gave the film 3 out of 5 and wrote "Overall, Thunivu is a film that brings back the Ajith we have enjoyed in the past. With an excellent premise, the film has a lot to offer. But, remember to look past the flaws".

Haricharan Pudipeddi of Hindustan Times wrote "With each collaboration, H Vinoth has managed to bring out something refreshing with respect to Ajith’s performance. In Thunivu, he doesn’t have any qualms in making Ajith play a mastermind criminal with no ethics. Manju Warrier, too, gets a role that she has so much fun with. The film does fumble towards the end, when the action feels underwhelming but the film has enough moments to keep one invested. Ghibran’s background score suits the mood of the film really well and so were his songs". Arvind V of Pinkvilla gave 3 out of 5 stars and wrote "Thunivu' is somewhat of a noisy film with a few superfluous and many convenient ideas. Yet, it works because of its lead man, larger-than-life action, and some plot points. The amount of effort shown by the action department is praiseworthy. This one also blends relatable issues without being too edgy in its treatment. The entertainment quotient gets the upper hand in some stretches, while pure action dominates otherwise. The gun battles could have been edited inventively so that the impact is strong".

Princy Alexandar of Onmanorama wrote "The message is also definitely an eye-opener for banks and corporates, but is not striking enough as the aim seems to be only to appease Ajith fans. The twists and turns in 'Thunivu' ensure the film is engaging. However, the drawback is the treatment and the plot’s failure to strike a balance".

Thinkal Menon of OTT Play gave 3 out of 5 stars and wrote "Thunivu, undoubtedly, is a treat for Ajith fans and action lovers. An engaging second half and more focus on the message Vinoth intended to convey would have made the film a thorough entertainer". Behindwoods gave the film 2.75 out of 5 and wrote "Overall, Thunivu has enough in the first half to satisfy Ajith fans and families while the second half could have been handled better comparatively. As of now, the film ends up as a good watch for the festival". Sudhir Srinivasan of Cinema Express gave the film 3 out of 5 stars and wrote "How much you like Thunivu depends on how much you are willing to forgive its weak portions—and of course, how much you have missed seeing Ajith Kumar enjoy breaking bad".

References

External links 
 
 

2020s Tamil-language films
Films about bank robbery
Films directed by H. Vinoth
Films scored by Mohamaad Ghibran
Films set in Chennai
Films shot in Bangkok
Films shot in Chennai
Films shot in Hyderabad, India
Indian action films
Indian heist films